Nahal Alexander, called Nahar Iskandar in Arabic, is a river in the States of Palestine and Israel that flows from the western side of the Samaria mountain belt in the West Bank to the Mediterranean Sea, north of Netanya. The length of the river is about 45 km. Several small streams flow into Nahal Alexander: Nablus, Te'enim, Ometz, Bahan, and Avihail. The river is the habitat of soft-shell turtles that can reach a size of 1.20 meters.

Flora and fauna
Nahal Alexander is the habitat of soft-shell turtles that can reach a size of 1.20 meters and weigh up to 50 kilograms. In addition to giant turtles, there are coots and other waterfowl, nutrias and swamp cats. Indigenous fish include catfish, tilapia, river eels and mullet. On the southern bank there are shifting sand dunes and on the northern bank, a eucalyptus grove.

History

Hurvat Samra (Khirbet Samra), an ancient ruin on a hill overlooking Nahal Alexander, may have been a customs station for goods transported down the river to the port near the estuary.

Beit Yanai beach is located where the river flows into the Mediterranean.  North of the beach are remnants of a quay built in 1938, during the British Mandate. It was used for clandestine Jewish immigration to Mandatory Palestine when British authorities turned away ships of European Jews fleeing the Nazis.

In the winter of 1991, Nahal Alexander overflowed and most of its soft-shelled turtle population drifted into the Mediterranean. When the remaining eggs that failed to hatch, the Israel Nature and Parks Authority launched a project to collect the eggs, incubate them and return the turtles to the water.

In 2003, Nahal Alexander was part of a cleanup project that won first prize in the Riverprize environmental rehabilitation competition in Australia after being one of the most polluted rivers in Israel.

Gallery

See also 
 Geography of Israel
 Geography of the State of Palestine
 Wildlife of Israel
 Biodiversity in Israel and Palestine
 Tourism in Israel
 Tourism in the State of Palestine
 National parks and nature reserves of Israel

References

External links
 Alexander Stream Hof Bet Yanai National Park - official site
 Zachi Evenor, Alexander Stream Photography, Flickr

National parks of Israel
Rivers of Israel
Landforms of Central District (Israel)
Protected areas of Central District (Israel)